Alan Levin (February 28, 1926 – 13 February 2006) was an American filmmaker and journalist best known for making documentaries on the Public Broadcasting Service (PBS) and Home Box Office (HBO) networks. Three of his documentaries won Emmy Awards.

Early life and career
Levin was born Alan Levinstein in Brooklyn, New York. He served during World War II and graduated from Wesleyan University in Connecticut in 1946. His career started as a journalist working for Associated Press and the New York Post. He worked for Senator Harrison Williams in 1963-64 before becoming a producer on WABC-TV between 1965-67.

His father, Herman, assisted Rabbi Mordecai Kaplan with his founding of the Jewish Reconstructionist movement in the 1930s.  His grandfather, Isaac Levinstein, owned several movie theaters in New York in the early 1900s.

Documentary career
Levin's documentary career started with WNET, a Public Broadcasting Service (PBS) primary member station. He first attracted attention with The New Immigrants in 1979 which explored the immigration of non-European migrants to the US and earned him his first Emmy.

His 1982 film Portrait of an American Zealot was one of the first films of the growing popularity of the so-called religious right. That film marked the end of his employment for PBS although he would continue to make films for the network. In 1986, he made Inside the Jury Room featuring the first jury deliberation to be filmed which was shown on PBS Frontline

He partnered with Bill Moyers to film a number of documentaries. The Secret Government: The Constitution in Crisis looked at the activities of the CIA leading up to the Iran-Contra Affair. It earned Levin his second Emmy.

Levin would later make documentaries for HBO. With his son, Marc Levin and his production partner Daphne Pinkerson, he made Thug Life about the lives of four prisoners in Washington. It earned him his third Emmy in 1999.

He died in Maplewood, New Jersey in February 2006.

References

Newsday "Documentary filmmaker Alan Levin dies at 79" 17 February 2006, retrieved 18 February 2006
Marquis Who's Who TM. Marquis Who's Who, 2006. "Alan Levin"

1926 births
2006 deaths
Wesleyan University alumni
American documentary filmmakers